Henry Hargreaves (born 1979 is a Brooklyn-based artist and food photographer.

Early life and education

Henry Hargreaves grew up in New Zealand. In high school, Christ's College in Christchurch, New Zealand, he took photography and then attended Canterbury University, earning a degree in American studies and film studies.

Career

Restaurants
Hargreaves honed his bartending skills at the original Lone Star branch on Manchester Street in Christchurch, known for its giant portions, and was then a bartender at Schiller's on the lower east side of Manhattan for three years after moving to New York. Since then has become a partner in Jack's Wife Freda in Soho, Saint Mazie in Williamsburg, Brooklyn. Butler Bakeshop in DUMBO

Model
While traveling, Henry was approached and recruited by a modeling agent. He modeled for Prada, YSL, Hermes, Lacoste, and Jil Sander. He modeled full-time for three years and was labeled one of the biggest models of 2002 and 2003.

Photographer
Hargreaves learned photography techniques from speaking with photographers and experimented with his own set. He works out of a studio in Williamsburg, Brooklyn and shoots for clients such as Ralph Lauren, NY Magazine, GQ, National Geographic, Boucheron, The New York Times, and Sagmeister. In 2010, he published the book 3DD: A 3-D Celebration of Breasts followed by 3DD Deluxe: Bigger and Better in 2011. He also photographed the Jack's Wife Freda cookbook  Hargreaves uses food as a medium in his photo series, including: Burning Calories, Food of the Rainbow, Mark Rice-Ko, Jello-O presidents, Edible Subway, Bacon Alphabet, and No Seconds. Other still life photo series include Zen of Yoda, Deep-Fried Gadgets, and Game Over. In 2018 he used as inspiration the cakes familiar to him from his childhood made from the Australian Women's Weekly Children's Birthday Cake Book for an exhibition in Wellington.

Hargreaves featured his photography in exhibitions at the MAXXI in Rome  The Venice Biennale, Herter Gallery at the University of Massachusetts, Amherst, The Lunch Box Gallery in Miami, Florida, and Precinct 35 in New Zealand. Henry Hargreaves also makes short animated videos.

Coffee Cups of the World
Hargreaves also has the fourth largest collection of coffee cups in the world and curates the popular instagram feed @coffeecupsoftheworld His collection has been exhibited at EEEEEATSCON in LA with The Infatuation and in New York at ORA Gallery

Awards and recognition

In 2012, Hargreaves worked on two Type Directors Club-winning projects. Projects Hargreaves worked on won the award for advertising campaign and for poster.
 Hargreaves won the grand prize for the Budweiser Made in America R/W/B competition, curated by rapper Jay-Z's Life+Times website in 2012.
 In 2012, Henry Hargreaves' Food of the Rainbow was ranked number six in the Top Ten Most Viral Web Content on Trendland.

See also 
 Photography
 Type Directors Club

References

External links
 Official website

1979 births
Living people
New Zealand photographers
Bartenders